José Antonio Luque Ramírez (born 16 February 1974) is a Spanish former professional footballer who played as a goalkeeper.

Club career
Luque was born in Marchena, Province of Seville. After playing five seasons with Sevilla FC's reserves he joined another side in Andalusia and the Segunda División B, Real Balompédica Linense, where he remained one year. In 2000 he signed for Recreativo de Huelva, being second-choice in his beginnings but being the most used goalkeeper in 2002–03's La Liga, in a campaign where the oldest club in Spain also reached the Copa del Rey final; during that year, he shared teams with Manuel Almunia – later of Arsenal fame.

In the following season, now in the Segunda División, Luque lost his place to newly signed Toño, regained it again when his competitor left for Racing de Santander and battled with him again when he returned in January 2006, on loan. In 2005–06, as Recre returned to the top flight after a three-year absence, he only conceded 22 goals in 24 matches, but was ineligible to receive the Ricardo Zamora Trophy due to the number of games played.

Surprisingly, Luque was deemed surplus to requirements by new Recreativo manager Marcelino García Toral, only being allowed to train separately. In January 2007 he moved to neighbours Écija Balompié on loan, helping as the club retained its third-tier status; returning to Huelva for the 2007–08 campaign, he found himself third-choice behind new acquisitions Mariano Barbosa and Stefano Sorrentino.

Luque retired from football in 2009 at the age of 35, after one season with Écija. Subsequently, he began training his hometown club.

Honours
Recreativo
Segunda División: 2005–06

References

External links

1974 births
Living people
People from Campiña de Morón y Marchena
Sportspeople from the Province of Seville
Spanish footballers
Footballers from Andalusia
Association football goalkeepers
La Liga players
Segunda División players
Segunda División B players
Sevilla Atlético players
Real Balompédica Linense footballers
Recreativo de Huelva players
Écija Balompié players
20th-century Spanish people
21st-century Spanish people